In functional analysis a partial isometry is a linear map between Hilbert spaces such that it is an isometry on the orthogonal complement of its kernel.

The orthogonal complement of its kernel is called the initial subspace and its range is called the final subspace.

Partial isometries appear in the polar decomposition.

General 

The concept of partial isometry can be defined in other equivalent ways.  If U is an isometric map defined on a closed subset  H1 of a Hilbert space H then we can define an extension W of U to all of H by the condition that W be zero on the orthogonal complement of H1. Thus a partial isometry is also sometimes defined as a closed partially defined isometric map.

Partial isometries (and projections) can be defined in the more abstract setting of a semigroup with involution; the definition coincides with the one herein.

In finite-dimensional vector spaces, a matrix  is a partial isometry if and only if  is the projection onto its support. Equivalently, any finite-dimensional partial isometry can be represented, in some choice of basis, as a matrix of the form , that is, as a matrix whose first  columns form an isometry, while all the other columns are identically 0.

Yet another general way to characterize finite-dimensional partial isometries is to observe that partial isometries coincide with the Hermitian conjugates of isometries, meaning that a given  is a partial isometry if and only if  is an isometry.

Operator Algebras 

For operator algebras one introduces the initial and final subspaces:

C*-Algebras 

For C*-algebras one has the chain of equivalences due to the C*-property:

So one defines partial isometries by either of the above and declares the initial resp. final projection to be W*W resp. WW*.

A pair of projections are partitioned by the equivalence relation:

It plays an important role in K-theory for C*-algebras and in the Murray-von Neumann theory of projections in a von Neumann algebra.

Special Classes

Projections 

Any orthogonal projection is one with common initial and final subspace:

Embeddings 

Any isometric embedding is one with full initial subspace:

Unitaries 

Any unitary operator is one with full initial and final subspace:

(Apart from these there are far more partial isometries.)

Examples

Nilpotents 

On the two-dimensional complex Hilbert space the matrix

is a partial isometry with initial subspace

 

and final subspace

Generic finite-dimensional examples 
Other possible examples in finite dimensions areThis is clearly not an isometry, because the columns are not orthonormal. One can similarly verify that , that is, that  is the projection onto its support.

Partial isometries need not correspond to squared matrices.

Leftshift and Rightshift 

On the square summable sequences the operators

which are related by

are partial isometries with initial subspace

and final subspace:

.

References 
John B. Conway (1999). "A course in operator theory", AMS Bookstore, 

Alan L. T. Paterson (1999). "Groupoids, inverse semigroups, and their operator algebras", Springer, 
Mark V. Lawson (1998). "Inverse semigroups: the theory of partial symmetries". World Scientific

External links 
Important properties and proofs
Alternative proofs

Operator theory
C*-algebras
Semigroup theory